The 1975–76 Divizia C was the 20th season of Liga III, the third tier of the Romanian football league system.

Team changes

To Divizia C
Relegated from Divizia B
 Foresta Fălticeni
 Chimia Brăila
 Oțelul Galați
 Relonul Săvinești
 Flacăra Moreni
 Metalul Drobeta-Turnu Severin
 Oltul Sfântu Gheorghe
 CSU Brașov
 Minerul Baia Sprie
 Minerul Anina
 Vulturii Textila Lugoj
 Metalul Aiud

Promoted from County Championship
 Progresul Fălticeni
 Spicul Țigănași
 Ozana Târgu Neamț
 Petrolistul Dărmănești
 Locomotiva Adjud
 Foresta Gugești
 Chimia Mărășești
 Carpați Nehoiu
 Autobuzul Făurei
 Gloria Murfatlar
 Minerul Măcin
 ICSIM București
 Avântul Urziceni
 Constructorul Pitești
 Electrica Titu
 Voința Caracal
 Constructorul TCI Craiova
 Gloria Reșița
 Constructorul Timișoara
 Gloria Arad
 Gloria Șimleu Silvaniei
 Constructorul Satu Mare
 Tehnofrig Cluj-Napoca
 Progresul Năsăud
 IMIX Agnita
 Utilajul Făgăraș
 Metalul Târgu Secuiesc

From Divizia C
Promoted to Divizia B
 CS Botoșani
 Viitorul Vaslui
 Prahova Ploiești
 Cimentul Medgidia
 Dunărea Giurgiu
 Chimia Turnu Măgurele
 Minerul Motru
 Unirea Tomnatic
 Dacia Orăștie
 CIL Sighetu Marmației
 Gloria Bistrița
 Nitramonia Făgăraș

Relegated to County Championship
 Sportul Muncitoresc Suceava
 Nicolina Iași
 Partizanul Bacău
 Constructorul Gheorghiu-Dej
 Dinamo Focșani
 Bujorii Târgu Bujor
 Tehnometal Galați
 Recolta Frecăței
 Voința Slobozia
 Laromet București
 Dacia Pitești
 Textilistul Pitești
 Progresul Strehaia
 Steagul Roșu Plenița
 Progresul Timișoara
 Crișana Sebiș
 Arieșul Câmpia Turzii
 Minaur Zlatna
 Unirea Tășnad
 Victoria Zalău
 Viitorul Târgu Mureș
 Unirea Cristuru Secuiesc
 Măgura Codlea
 Carpați Covasna

Other
Oțelul Galați were disbanded.

Știința Bacău and Carom Onești merged, the first one being absorbed by the second one. After the merge, Carom was moved to Borzești, a village (now part of Onești), renamed as CSM Borzești and took the place in second division of Știința Bacău.

Constructorul Galați and Victoria Tecuci merged, the first one being absorbed by the second one. Third division club Victoria Tecuci therefore took Constructorul Galați place in the second division.

Renamed teams
Comerțul Brăila was renamed as Progresul Brăila.

Știința Constanța was renamed as Unirea Știința Eforie Nord.

Cimentul Târgu Jiu was renamed as Cimentul Victoria Târgu Jiu.

Dinamo Orșova was renamed as Dierna Orșova.

CIL Drobeta-Turnu Severin was renamed as Unirea Drobeta-Turnu Severin.

Olimpia Oradea merged with Dinamo Oradea and was renamed as Dinamo MIU Oradea.

CFR Sighișoara was renamed as Metalul Sighișoara.

League tables

Seria I

Seria II

Seria III

Seria IV

Seria V

Seria VI

Seria VII

Seria VIII

Seria IX

Seria X

Seria XI

Seria XII

See also 
 1975–76 Divizia A
 1975–76 Divizia B
 1975–76 County Championship

References 

Liga III seasons
3
Romania